Axinotoma is a genus of beetles in the family Carabidae first described by Pierre François Marie Auguste Dejean in 1829.

Species 
Axinotoma contains the following twenty-four species:
 Axinotoma ambigena (Jeannel, 1946)
 Axinotoma bifida Facchini, 2011
 Axinotoma decellei Basilewsky, 1968
 Axinotoma demeyeri Facchini, 2011
 Axinotoma dilatipalpis Facchini, 2011
 Axinotoma fallax Dejean, 1829
 Axinotoma gabonica Facchini, 2017
 Axinotoma hulstaerti Basilewsky, 1950
 Axinotoma kivuensis Facchini, 2011
 Axinotoma latipalpis Basilewsky, 1968
 Axinotoma lepersonneae Burgeon, 1942
 Axinotoma maynei Burgeon, 1936
 Axinotoma morettoi Facchini, 2011
 Axinotoma obtuseangula Peringuey, 1896
 Axinotoma perreiri (Jeannel, 1946)
 Axinotoma posticallis Peringuey, 1896
 Axinotoma pseudofallax Facchini, 2003
 Axinotoma pseudomaynei Facchini, 2017
 Axinotoma schuelei Facchini, 2011
 Axinotoma sinuaticollis Facchini, 2011
 Axinotoma sinuatipennis Facchini, 2011
 Axinotoma tanzaniana Facchini, 2003
 Axinotoma toledanoi Facchini, 2011
 Axinotoma viossati Sciaky & Toledano, 1995

References

External links

Harpalinae